

Events 
This is a list of notable events in music that took place in the 1390s.
1390
The monastery at Durham appoints John Stele to teach the Benedictine monks and eight secular boys to play the organs and to sing "triple song" (possibly faburden).
1391
 1 February – Antonio Zacara da Teramo, a singer in the papal chapel, is appointed "scriptor litterarum apostolicarum" (papal secretary) by Pope Boniface IX.
exact dates unknown
The band of the Worshipful Company of Goldsmiths, London, purchases new trumpets, clarions, shawms, a bombard, and a bagpipe.
Johannes Tapissier travels to Milan and Avignon in the entourage of Philip the Bold, Duke of Burgundy.
1392
 25 November – Eustache Deschamps completes .
exact date unknown – A group of merchants in Birmingham establish the Gild of the Holy Cross, which appointed priests to sing at the parish church, St Martin in the Bull Ring, as well as an organist whom they housed near to the church.
1393
exact date unknown – The French singer and composer Bosquet (Johannes de Bosco, Jean du Bois) receives a papal grant as a musician to Duke Louis II of Anjou.
1394
early in the year – The canons of Notre-Dame de Paris successfully solicit 200 francs from Charles VI for rebuilding the cathedral organ, after the original had fallen into disrepair.
1395
exact date unknown – Johannes Tapissier makes a second visit to Avignon in the entourage of Philip the Bold.
1397
exact date unknown – Earliest reference to a clavecembalum (in this case meaning a clavichord), in a letter from a Paduan lawyer Lambertacci, attributing its invention to Magister Armanus de Alemania.
1399
exact date unknown – Johannes Tapissier visits Flanders in the entourage of Philip the Bold.

Works 
 c. 1390–95. Jacob Senleches – La harpe de melodie
1399
May or June – Johannes Ciconia, Una panthera in compagnia de Marte madrigal for three voices, written for the diplomatic visit by Lazzaro Guinigi of Lucca to Gian Galeazzo Visconti in Pavia .

Births 

 August 5, c. 1397 – Guillaume Dufay, Franco-Flemish composer (died November 27, 1474)

Deaths
1391
Before June 10 – Matheus de Sancto Johanne, French composer
1397
September 2 – Francesco Landini, Italian composer, poet, organist, singer and instrument maker (born c.1325)

References

14th century in music
Music